The Communist Party of Canada fielded several candidates in the 1979 federal election, none of whom were elected.  Information about these candidates may be found on this page.

Ontario

John Bizzell (Broadview—Greenwood)

Bizzell was raised in South Africa, and was a vocal opponent of that country's apartheid government during the 1960s.  He was imprisoned in 1964, and was tortured by Capt. T.J. Swanepoel while in jail.  He later moved to Canada, where earned a Master's Degree from the University of Toronto and worked as an architect.  In 1986, he called for Canada to impose mandatory sanctions against South Africa and to support the then-outlawed African National Congress.

Bizzell was the election coordinator for the Communist Party in Toronto during the late 1970s and early 1980s.  He was the party's national campaign manager in the 1984 federal election, and its central organizer in 1988.  His wife, Maggie Bizzell, was also a Communist Party candidate.  Bizzell was endorsed by the Movement for Municipal Reform in 1976, when running for a municipal seat in Toronto.

He returned to South Africa after the end of apartheid, and in 2002 issued a book entitled Blueprints in Black and White - The Built Environment Professions in South Africa - An Outline History.  In 2005, African National Congress members on the Durban Municipal Council proposed renaming Kloof Memorial Park in his honour.

References